Eygelshoven station is a railway station southwest of Eygelshoven, the Netherlands. It is located on the Schaesberg–Simpelveld railway, which is part of the Heuvellandlijn (Maastricht–Kerkrade). Train services are operated by Arriva.

History
Initially called Hopel station, the first train arrived at the station on 12 May 1949, while passenger services commenced on 15 May 1949. The station was renamed to Eygelshoven on 22 May 1966.

Train services
The following local train services call at this station:
Stoptrein: Sittard–Heerlen–Kerkrade

See also
Eygelshoven Markt railway station, located north of the same town

References

External links
NS website 
Dutch Public Transport journey planner 

Railway stations in Kerkrade
Railway stations opened in 1949
Railway stations on the Heuvellandlijn